Beauvoisin is a commune in the Gard department in southern France. Beauvoisin station has rail connections to Nîmes and Le Grau-du-Roi.

Beauvoisin is a small southern village with a post office, bar, newsagent, grocers, butchers and a couple of bakeries. It retains a tradition of bull running in the city streets and the arenas. This involves retrieving decorations that are attached to the bull's horns. The idea is to demonstrate bravery rather than to kill or gain a victory over a bull. Another local tradition is the Empègue which appears annually in designs that reflect the local culture.

Historic buildings
The castle was an early building being constructed in 1067 for the Knights Templar. 

The protestant temple was built in 1819 by the architect Charled Durand. A bell tower was added in 1835. In 2012, it was officially declared a historical monument.

Population

See also
 Costières de Nîmes AOC
Communes of the Gard department

References

Communes of Gard